"Somebody That I Used to Know" is a song written, produced, and performed by Belgian-Australian singer-songwriter Gotye featuring vocals from New Zealand singer Kimbra. The song was released in Australia and New Zealand by Eleven Music on 5 July 2011 as the second single from Gotye's third studio album, Making Mirrors (2011). It was later released by Universal Music in December 2011 in the United Kingdom, and 20 January 2012 in the United States and Ireland. "Somebody That I Used to Know" was written and recorded by Gotye at his parents' house on the Mornington Peninsula in Victoria, Australia, and is lyrically related to the experiences he has had with relationships.

"Somebody That I Used to Know" is a mid-tempo ballad. It samples Luiz Bonfá's instrumental "Seville" from his 1967 album Luiz Bonfa Plays Great Songs. The song received a positive reception from critics, who noted the similarities between the song and works by Sting, Peter Gabriel, and American folk band Bon Iver. In Australia, the song won the Triple J Hottest 100 poll at the end of 2011, as well as ARIA Awards for song of the year and best video, while Kimbra was voted best female artist and Gotye was named best male artist and producer of the year. The song came ninth in the Triple J Hottest 100 of the Past 20 Years, 2013. In 2013, the song won two Grammy Awards for Best Pop Duo/Group Performance and Record of the Year.

Commercially, "Somebody That I Used to Know" was a global success and became both artists' signature song. It reached the top of the charts in the US, UK, Australia and New Zealand, as well as 25 other official charts, and reached the top 10 in more than 30 countries around the world. It was the most commercially successful song of 2011 in Flanders (Belgium), the most successful song of 2012 in Wallonia (Belgium), Canada, Israel, the UK, and the US, and the most successful song of the 2010s decade by an Australian artist in Australia. It is certified Multiplatinum in ten countries, including Diamond in Australia. The song has sold more than 13 million copies worldwide, becoming one of the best-selling digital singles of all time. In addition to the Hot 100, it was also placed at the top of Billboards year-end Adult Pop Songs and Alternative Songs charts and many other charts around the world.

"Somebody That I Used to Know" has been performed several times on major US TV shows such as The Voice, American Idol, and Saturday Night Live.

The hit song's YouTube video was directed by Australian artist Natasha Pincus. The video, which has received over 2 billion views on YouTube as of November 2022, premiered on 5 July 2011. It shows Gotye and Kimbra naked against a white backdrop. While they sing, a pattern of paint gradually covers their skin and the backdrop via stop motion animation.

Composition and recording 
Gotye discussed writing "Somebody That I Used to Know" in an interview with Sound on Sound:

"Somebody That I Used to Know" is a mid-tempo art pop song and has a length of four minutes and five seconds.  Gotye uses a sample of Brazilian jazz guitarist Luiz Bonfá's 1967 instrumental song "Seville", with additional instrumentations of beats and a xylophone playing a melody based on Baa, Baa, Black Sheep. It was written and produced by Gotye himself, while in his parents' barn on the Mornington Peninsula, Victoria. Gotye commented that he wrote the song "in quite a linear way", explaining that "I wrote the first verse, the second verse, and I'd got to the end of the first chorus and for the first time ever I thought, 'There's no interesting way to add to this guy's story'. It felt weak."

The track was recorded between January and May 2011 with Gotye struggling to find a suitable female vocalist, as a "'high profile' female vocalist" cancelled the collaboration at the last minute, and Kimbra "lucked out as the replacement". He tested his girlfriend, Tash Parker, but "somehow their happiness meant that it didn't work out" so he followed the recommendation of the song's mixer and used Kimbra's vocals. Martin Davies from Click Music considered the song "instantly captivating", and named Kimbra's voice "clean and sugar-soaked", further commenting that it bears an "uncanny resemblance" to singer Katy Perry.

Gotye stated that the song was "definitely drawn from various experiences I've had in relationships breaking up, and in the parts of the more reflective parts of the song, in the aftermath and the memory of those different relationships and what they were and how they broke up and what's going on in everyone's minds. Yeah, so it's an amalgam of different feelings but not completely made up as such." In an interview with Rolling Stone (Australia), he described the song as "a curated reflection of multiple past relationships".

Critical reception
The song received generally positive reviews, winning the Grammy for Record of the Year. Take 40 Australia elaborated on the audience's reception at the July 2011 Splendour in the Grass festival, "Gotye's latest song featuring Kimbra 'Somebody That I Used To Know' had become somewhat of an unofficial anthem for the festival ... every car was cranking it over their speakers all day, every day ... and the question on everyone's lips was whether or not Kimbra would join him on the track. Fortunately, dreams came true ... he smashed out an incredible set climaxing with a version of the song with Kimbra on co-lead vocals that people couldn't stop talking about all weekend long". Allmusic's Jon O'Brien felt the track was an "unexpected chart-topper ... [it] is an oddball break-up song whose stuttering rhythms, reggae hooks, and hushed vocals sound like The Police as remixed by The xx".

Writing for Digital Spy, Lewis Corner rated the song four stars out of five and described it as "a Bon Iver-styled ballad for the music-buying masses". Martin Davies from Click Music gave the song five stars out of five and stated that the song is "that rare example of a track that hits you squarely between the eyes".

In November 2011, music blog This Must Be Pop predicted the song as a post-Christmas UK hit. John Watson, who co-manages Gotye with Danny Rogers, said of the single's success: "We've never seen any song make a deeper or more immediate connection with so many people. It's a really special recording and video". Talking about the overwhelming reception and the amount of coverage received, Gotye commented that "I don't really feel like it [the song] belongs to me anymore." He further explained that "sometimes I feel like I'm a bit sick of it. My inbox, on any given day, has at least five covers or parodies or remixes of it and there's only so many times you can listen to the one song."

Commercial performance
In the week commencing 18 July 2011, "Somebody That I Used to Know" debuted at number 27 on the ARIA Singles Chart. It was released on 5 July 2011 in Australia and New Zealand by Eleven Music as the second single from his third studio album, Making Mirrors (2011). Despite an initial lack of airplay on major radio stations, the song reached number 1 in the week ending 15 August, becoming the first single by either artist to do so and their most successful single. Until 2014, the song was one of the two-second-longest-running Australian number-one songs, with eight weeks at the top, tied with Savage Garden's 1997 song "Truly Madly Deeply", and behind Daddy Cool's 1971 hit "Eagle Rock", which stayed there for ten weeks. In August 2011, the song was released in Belgium and the Netherlands. After a few weeks in the charts, it reached number 1 in both countries, topping the Belgian Singles Chart for 12 weeks. Also in August, "Somebody That I Used to Know" debuted at number 4 in New Zealand on the RIANZ Singles Chart, reaching number 1 three weeks later, thus making Gotye the first Australian artist to reach number 1 since Guy Sebastian did so in February 2011 with "Who's That Girl". The song debuted on the Irish Singles Chart on 13 January 2012 at number 47, later reaching number 1 position. In the United Kingdom, "Somebody That I Used to Know" spent five non-consecutive weeks at number 1.

In the United States, it debuted at number 91 on the Billboard Hot 100 on 14 January 2012. In its fifteenth week on the chart – after it was performed by Matt Bomer and Darren Criss on Glee on 10 April; by Phillip Phillips and Elise Testone on the eleventh season of American Idol before more than 16 million viewers on 11 April; and by Gotye and Kimbra on Saturday Night Live on 14 April – the song rose to number 1, where it stayed for eight consecutive weeks. thus becoming the longest-running number 1 by a solo male artist since Flo Rida's "Low" led for ten weeks in 2008. The song had the fourth highest-selling single week ever with 542,000 digital downloads sold, and was the first Australian single to top the Hot 100 since Savage Garden's "I Knew I Loved You" in 2000. The song also topped the Alternative Songs chart for twelve weeks tying with Fuel's Hemorrhage (In My Hands) and Linkin Park's Numb and New Divide, as well as topping the Radio Songs, Digital Songs, On-Demand Songs, Pop Songs, Adult Pop Songs, Adult Contemporary, and Hot Dance Club Songs charts in that country. On 2 May 2012 the song became the first to reach digital sales of at least 400,000 for three consecutive weeks, and the following week it became the first to simultaneously top the Alternative Songs, Hot Dance Club Songs, and Dance Mix Show Airplay charts. It also became the number 1 song of 2012 on the Alternative Songs, Adult Pop Songs, and Billboard Hot 100 charts. By 22 February 2013, the song became the tenth longest-charting song in the history of the Billboard Hot 100, at 59 weeks on the chart. As of October 2015, the song has sold 7.9 million copies in the US, making it the country's fourth all-time best-selling digital single.

"Somebody That I Used to Know" reached number one in more than 23 national charts and charted inside the top ten in more than 30 countries around the world. By the end of 2012, the song became the best-selling song of that year with 11.8 million copies sold, ranking among the best-selling digital singles of all time. As of April 2012, it is the most downloaded song ever in Belgium, as well as being the third best-selling digital single in Germany with sales between 500,000 and 600,000 copies, and the most successful song in the history of the Dutch charts. As of January 2013 it has received eleven Platinum certifications in Australia, accounting for shipments exceeding 770,000 units. In New Zealand, it was certified four times Platinum. The song was the best-selling single of 2012 in the UK with 1,318,000 copies sold.

Gotye has not monetised the song or any of his others through advertisements on YouTube, as he believes that there is too much advertising in the world. He has licensed its use to student films free of charge, but has turned down approaches from some commercial films: "If someone wants to use it commercially I look at what the budget is and the creativity of the project".

Accolades
In July 2011, the song finished third in the Vanda & Young Global Songwriting Competition Earlier that year, Gotye had first noticed Kimbra when both were short-listed as finalists for the competition. At the ARIA Music Awards of 2011, "Somebody That I Used to Know" won Single of the Year, Best Pop Release, Best Video (for Natasha Pincus), Engineer of the Year (for François Tétaz) and Producer of the Year (for Gotye). Gotye also won Best Male Artist for the song while Kimbra won Best Female Artist for her previous single, "Cameo Lover". At the APRA Music Awards of 2012, "Somebody That I Used to Know" won Most Played Australian Work and Song of the Year and Gotye won Songwriter of the Year. It was also nominated at the 2012 Teen Choice Awards for "Choice Rock Song" and "Choice Break-Up Song". The song was nominated at the 55th Grammy Awards for Record of the Year and Best Pop Duo/Group Performance, winning both awards. The Village Voices Pazz & Jop annual critics' poll ranked "Somebody That I Used to Know" at number eight of the best music of 2012.

In 2019, Stereogum ranked the song as the 161st best song of the 2010s. In January 2018, as part of Triple M's "Ozzest 100", the 'most Australian' songs of all time, "Somebody That I Used to Know" was ranked number 98. In 2021, its first year of eligibility, "Somebody That I Used to Know" was inducted into the National Film and Sound Archive's Sounds of Australia as an Australian sound recording with "cultural, historical and aesthetic significance."

Music video 

The music video for "Somebody That I Used to Know" was produced, directed and edited by Australian artist Natasha Pincus and filmed by Australian cinematographer Warwick Field. It shows Gotye and Kimbra naked throughout the clip, and as they sing, his skin is gradually painted into the backdrop via stop motion animation. In the director's cut, this went as far as to feature concealed nudity, though this version was never posted. The video's background is based on a 1980s artwork created by Gotye's father, Frank de Backer, who also designed the cover art for the related album, Making Mirrors. Emma Hack, an Australian artist and skin illustrator based in Adelaide, was hired by Pincus to work on the body paintings for Gotye and Kimbra. Melbourne Scenic Artist Howard Clark painted the backdrop. According to Hack, it took more than 23 hours to paint both Gotye and Kimbra to fit with Howard's background. Their painting symbolises their combined relationship.

Before its official premiere, the music video was leaked on Take 40 Australia's website. According to Pincus, "It was stolen out of our system. I guess it's always wanted to get out there. Within five minutes it was everywhere". On 30 July 2011 it was officially premiered on YouTube and on the Australian music show Rage. The music video was well received for its artistic style, picking up 200,000 views in its first two weeks, as well as receiving promotion on Twitter by actor Ashton Kutcher and Katy Perry.

"What a video!" Snow Patrol's Gary Lightbody enthused to Q. "I have become obsessed with it and not just because I'm in love with Kimbra. Gotye himself is an engaging character for sure... his solemnly expressive eyes finish a journey his lyrics only begin. 'Told myself that you were right for me but felt so lonely in your company' – simple, pure, and devastating. None more than the title line when it speaks of the end of love with prosaic brutality: 'Now you're just somebody that I used to know.' Great video, powerful lyrics, and a stunning voice. Oh, and Kimbra... my poor heart..."

On November 1st, 2022, the video hit 2 billion views and 13 million likes on YouTube. The video for "Somebody That I Used to Know" was voted number 1 in the annual Rage Fifty countdown. Andy Samberg and Taran Killam parodied the video in a Saturday Night Live "digital short" that coincided with Gotye's 14 April 2012 performance on the show. The video was nominated for Video of the Year and Best Editing in a Video at the 2012 MTV Video Music Awards. As of January 2015, Billboard named the video as one of the 20 best of the 2010s (so far).

Cover versions and media appearances 
In February 2012, Gotye made his American television debut on Jimmy Kimmel Live! where he performed the song. The song has since been featured on the TV series 90210, Gossip Girl, and The Voice of Ireland by Andy Mac Unfraidh. The song was featured in the film Boyhood. On 16 May 2012, fun. along with Paramore's front vocalist Hayley Williams covered the song at BBC Radio 1's Live Lounge.

"Somebody That I Used to Know" was covered by Canadian indie rock group Walk Off the Earth. Their January, 2012 YouTube video of the song created a sensation, artfully depicting the 5 band members playing the song on a single guitar. As of February, 2023, the 3 identical YouTube postings of the video have received a total of over 214 million views. Also in January, 2012, Walk off the Earth had their U.S. television debut on The Ellen DeGeneres Show, recreating the single-guitar performance live. Saying that she wanted to "help," Ellen humorously gifted the group with a matched set of 5 electric guitars.
 
In February 2012, Rita Ora covered the song at BBC Radio 1's Live Lounge.

The a cappella group Pentatonix created a viral YouTube video in February 2012 and released the track on their EP, "PTX Volume 1" on 26 June 2012

Phillip Phillips and Elise Testone covered the song on the eleventh season of American Idol on 11 April 2012.

In April, 2012, actors Darren Criss and Matt Bomer covered the song in the "Big Brother" episode of Glee as Blaine Anderson and Cooper Anderson). It sold 152,000 digital downloads in its first week of release and debuted on the Digital Songs chart at number 10 and the Hot 100 at number 26.

"Somebody That I Used to Know" was also first played live by Coheed and Cambria on 29 April 2012, as a frequent feature on their 2012 headlining tour.

In May 2012, American duo Karmin made a cover of the song on Sirius XM Hits.

On 23 May 2012, Internet cartoon band Your Favorite Martian did a cover of the song.

English fingerstyle guitarist Mike Dawes released a technically virtuosic arrangement of the song on his debut album What Just Happened? in 2013, garnering much praise, including from Gotye himself.

"Weird Al" Yankovic recorded a cover as part of his polka medley "NOW That's What I Call Polka!" for his 2014 album Mandatory Fun.

Jazz pianist Jacky Terrasson included the song in his 2015 album Take This.

"Somebody That I Used to Know" has been covered by many artists, including Ingrid Michaelson, The Fergies, Benee, Sam Tsui, and Right the Stars featuring Karmina. Dutch DJ Tiësto remixed the song for his album Club Life: Volume Two Miami.

Gotye paid tribute to the overwhelming number of cover versions of the song by personally creating a video remix, released in August 2012, using segments from hundreds of online covers to create a new, unique version of the track, titled "Somebodies: A YouTube Orchestra". Gotye states the concept "was directly inspired here by Kutiman's Thru-You project", released in March 2009, which edited numerous YouTube videos to create a new cohesive song.

Track listing 

Digital download
 "Somebody That I Used to Know"  – 4:04
 "Somebody That I Used to Know" (Radio Mix)  – 3:33
 "Somebody That I Used to Know" (Instrumental) —4:04

Digital download – Remix
 "Somebody That I Used to Know"  – 4:33

7-inch vinyl single
 "Somebody That I Used to Know"  – 4:04
 "Bronte" – 3:13

CD single
 "Somebody That I Used to Know"  – 4:04
 "Easy Way Out" – 1:57

Credits and personnel 
 Gotye – songwriter, producer, assistant mixer, recording, lead and backing vocals, guitar, synthesizer, xylophone, flutes, percussion, samples
 François Tétaz – mixer, engineer
 Lucas Taranto – bass guitar
 Kimbra – lead and backing vocals
 William Bowden – mastering
 Ralph Thane – remixer (Radio Mix)
 Frank De Backer – artwork (back and inside cover painting, handwriting)
 Kat Kallady – artwork (front cover painting)

Credits adapted from "Somebody That I Used to Know" CD single liner notes.

Charts

Weekly charts

Year-end charts

Decade-end charts

All-time charts

Certifications and sales

Release history

Walk Off the Earth version 

In January 2012, Canadian indie rock group Walk Off the Earth uploaded a cover of "Somebody That I Used to Know" to YouTube. Their version uses a single guitar played simultaneously by all five band members. As of April 2012, the song had sold 187,000 units in the United States.

Track listing 
 CD single
 "Somebody That I Used to Know" – 4:08
 "Somebody That I Used to Know" (Music video) – 4:25
 CD maxi-single
 "Somebody That I Used to Know" – 4:08
 "Money Tree" – 3:13
 "Joan and Bobby" – 3:38
 "From Me to You" – 1:48
 "Somebody That I Used to Know" (Video) – 4:25

Charts

Year-end charts

Certifications

Glee cast version 

The song was covered in the Glee episode "Big Brother" and performed by Darren Criss (as Blaine Anderson) and Matt Bomer (as Cooper Anderson). It sold 152,000 digital downloads in its first week of release and debuted on the Digital Songs chart at number 10 and the Hot 100 at number 26.

Charts

Mayday Parade version 

The alternative rock band Mayday Parade released a cover of this song featuring Pierce The Veil's lead vocalist Vic Fuentes for the fifth edition of the compilation album Punk Goes Pop, which features bands of the punk, alternative, and hardcore genres covering hit pop songs. Their cover became the first single from a Punk Goes... compilation album to chart on a Billboard chart, reaching number 18 on US Rock Songs. Alternative Press named their version as the fourth best "Top 50 Punk Goes Pop covers of all time".

Charts

Three Days Grace version

In 2020, Canadian rock band Three Days Grace covered the song and released it as a non-album single. The song was later included as a bonus track on the Japanese version of the group's seventh album Explosions. A music video (directed by Mike Filsinger) was also released for this version, which features the band performing in a Sketch-like background. This version reached number 7 on the Billboard Canada Rock charts and number 19 on the US Rock Airplay charts. Lead vocalist Matt Walst also noted about the song, saying: "The first time I heard 'Somebody That I Used to Know' I got goosebumps! This has only happened to me a few times in my life. I remember listening to it over and over and just being happy. Music releases a mood enhancing chemical in the brain that can set good moods and peak enjoyment. Music is truly the best drug!" Their cover charted in the rock song charts of Canada and the United States.

Charts

Year-end charts

See also 

 List of Airplay 100 number ones of the 2010s
 List of best-selling singles
 List of best-selling singles in Australia
 List of best-selling singles in the United States
 List of million-selling singles in the United Kingdom
 List of number-one singles of 2011 (Australia)
 List of Ultratop 50 number-one singles of 2011
 List of number-one singles from the 2010s (New Zealand)
 List of Dutch Top 40 number-one singles of 2011
 List of number-one hits of 2011 (Germany)
 List of number-one hits of 2012 (Austria)
 List of number-one singles of 2012 (Poland)
 List of number-one singles of 2012 (Ireland)
 List of number-one singles of 2012 (UK)
 List of number-one Billboard Alternative Songs of 2012
 List of number-one dance singles of 2012 (U.S.)
 List of number-one dance airplay hits of 2012 (U.S.)
 List of number-one digital songs of 2012 (U.S.)
 List of Hot 100 number-one singles of 2012 (U.S.)
 List of Hot 100 number-one singles of 2012 (Canada)
 List of Danish number-one hits of 2012
 List of number-one hits of 2012 (Italy)
 List of number-one hits of 2012 (France)
 List of number-one singles of 2012 (Finland)
 List of number-one singles of 2012 (Sweden)
 List of Mainstream Top 40 number-one hits of 2012 (U.S.)
 List of Adult Top 40 number-one singles of 2012
 List of Billboard Adult Contemporary number ones of 2012 and 2013 (U.S.)

References

External links 
 

2010s ballads
2011 singles
2011 songs
2012 singles
2012 songs
APRA Award winners
ARIA Award-winning songs
Gotye songs
Kimbra songs
Three Days Grace songs
Songs written by Gotye
Pop ballads
Male–female vocal duets
Number-one singles in Australia
Number-one singles in Austria
Ultratop 50 Singles (Flanders) number-one singles
Ultratop 50 Singles (Wallonia) number-one singles
Canadian Hot 100 number-one singles
Number-one singles in Denmark
Number-one singles in Finland
SNEP Top Singles number-one singles
Number-one singles in Germany
Irish Singles Chart number-one singles
Number-one singles in Israel
Number-one singles in Italy
Number-one singles in Hungary
Number-one singles in the Czech Republic
Dutch Top 40 number-one singles
Number-one singles in New Zealand
Number-one singles in Poland
Number-one singles in Romania
Number-one singles in Scotland
Number-one singles in Sweden
UK Singles Chart number-one singles
Billboard Hot 100 number-one singles
Monitor Latino Top Inglés number-one singles
Record Report Pop Rock General number-one singles
Songs about heartache
Grammy Award for Record of the Year
Grammy Award for Best Pop Duo/Group Performance
Viral videos
Eleven: A Music Company singles
Universal Music Group singles
Columbia Records singles
Fearless Records singles
RCA Records singles
Alternative rock songs